Joseph Earl Ohl (January 10, 1888 – December 18, 1951) was a pitcher in Major League Baseball. He played for the Washington Senators in 1909.

Ohl was born in the Jobstown section of Springfield Township, Burlington County, New Jersey.

References

External links

1888 births
1951 deaths
Major League Baseball pitchers
Washington Senators (1901–1960) players
Baseball players from New Jersey
Youngstown Champs players
Lancaster Red Roses players
People from Springfield Township, Burlington County, New Jersey
Sportspeople from Burlington County, New Jersey